William James Money,  (8 February 1906 - 14 January 1989) was an Australian rules footballer who played with Geelong in the Victorian Football League (VFL).

Money appeared in just two senior games for Geelong, both in the 1928 VFL season. He played well, however, in the league seconds that year, sharing the Gardiner Medal with Norman Driver of Melbourne.

Money later served in the Australian Army during World War II, spending two years serving in Palestine.

Money was also prominent in the Scouting movement, and was appointed as a Member of the Order of the British Empire in 1979 for his services to Scouting.

References

External links
 
 

1906 births
1989 deaths
VFL/AFL players born outside Australia
Geelong Football Club players
Australian players of Australian rules football
Scottish emigrants to Australia
Sportspeople from Glasgow
Australian Army personnel of World War II
Members of the Order of the British Empire
Scottish players of Australian rules football
Military personnel from Victoria (Australia)